The Battle of Vescera (modern Biskra in Algeria) was fought in 682 or 683 between the Berbers of King Caecilius and their Byzantine allies from the Exarchate of Carthage against an Umayyad Arab army under Uqba ibn Nafi (the founder of Kairouan). Uqba ibn Nafi had led his men in an expedition across north Africa, eventually reaching the Atlantic Ocean and marching as far south as the Draa and Sous rivers. On his return, he was ambushed by the Berber-Byzantine coalition at Tehouda (Thabudeos) south Vescera, defeated, and killed.

Citation

682
Vescera
Vescera
Vescera
Muslim conquest of the Maghreb
Vescera
680s in the Byzantine Empire
680s in the Umayyad Caliphate